is a Japanese actress and singer. Along with the ranking in the top 100 in the Oricon Singles Chart for several of her songs, her single "Zettai! Part 2" reached number 42. In 2003, she married the Japanese pro wrestler known as Super Delfin.

Discography
 "Zettai! Part 2" (1990) Ranma ½ opening theme

Films
 Buta no Mukui (1999)
 Izure no Mori ka Aoki Umi (2004)

TV programs
 Waratte Iitomo! (1991–1992)
 Anime Himitsu no Hanazono (sings the opening and closing music)

References

External links
 
 

Japanese idols
Japanese television personalities
1975 births
People from Naha
Living people
Musicians from Okinawa Prefecture